Neithalur is a village in the Papanasam taluk of Thanjavur district, Tamil Nadu, India.

The total geographical area of village is 785.01 hectares.

Demographics 

As per the 2001 census, Neithalur had a total population of 876 with 457 males and 419 females. The sex ratio was 917. The literacy rate was 61.13.

References 

 

Villages in Thanjavur district